João Costa (21 July 1920 – 3 October 2010) was a Portuguese fencer. He competed in the team épée events at the 1948 and 1952 Summer Olympics.

References

External links
 

1920 births
2010 deaths
Portuguese male épée fencers
Olympic fencers of Portugal
Fencers at the 1948 Summer Olympics
Fencers at the 1952 Summer Olympics
Sportspeople from Lisbon